Bob McPhail (birth unknown – death unknown) was an English rugby union and professional rugby league footballer who played in the 1900s, he was one of five brothers, four of whom played rugby.

Background
Bob McPhail was born in Wakefield, West Riding of Yorkshire, England.

Playing career

Rugby union career
Bob McPhail started his rugby career with Sandal St Helen's RFC before joining Headingley FC where he played alongside elder brother John McPhail. Both later joined Wakefield RFC. Bob scored at least four tries for Wakefield RFC during the 1902/03 season. In the same season he played three times for Yorkshire RFU.

Rugby league career
He made his début for Wakefield Trinity during April 1904, and he played his last match for Wakefield Trinity during the 1908–09 season, he appears to have scored no drop-goals (or field-goals as they are currently known in Australasia), but prior to the 1974–75 season all goals, whether; conversions, penalties, or drop-goals, scored 2-points, consequently prior to this date drop-goals were often not explicitly documented, therefore '0' drop-goals may indicate drop-goals not recorded, rather than no drop-goals scored. In addition, prior to the 1949–50 season, the archaic field-goal was also still a valid means of scoring points.

References

External links
Search for "McPhail" at rugbyleagueproject.org
Search for "McPhail" at espn.co.uk

English rugby league players
English rugby union players
Leeds Tykes players
Place of death missing
Rugby league centres
Rugby league players from Wakefield
Rugby union players from Wakefield
Wakefield RFC players
Wakefield Trinity players
Year of birth missing
Year of death missing
Yorkshire County RFU players
Yorkshire rugby league team players